Margarete Jonas (née Towarek; 13 June 1898 in Vienna – 7 August 1976 in Vienna) was the wife of Franz Jonas, who served as federal president of Austria. 
They married in 1922. She spoke German, English and Czech. She is buried next to her husband in the presidential vault in the Wiener Zentralfriedhof.

References

1898 births
1976 deaths
Spouses of presidents of Austria
People from Vienna